Diego Martín Bonilla Bastos (born September 21, 1980 in Montevideo) is a Uruguayan former professional footballer who played as a defender.

External links
 Diego Bonilla at playmakerstats.com (English version of ceroacero.es)

1980 births
Living people
Uruguayan footballers
Footballers from Montevideo
Association football defenders
Uruguayan Primera División players
Categoría Primera A players
C.A. Rentistas players
Club Nacional de Football players
Montevideo Wanderers F.C. players
Atlético Bucaramanga footballers
Millonarios F.C. players
Uruguayan expatriate footballers
Uruguayan expatriate sportspeople in Colombia
Expatriate footballers in Colombia